"Baila Así" (English: "Dance Like This") is a song by American DJ group duo Play-N-Skillz, Mexican singer Thalía and American singer Becky G, featuring fellow American singer Chiquis. It was released by Sony Music Latin on September 16, 2021.

Music video
The music video was released on January 24, 2022. It was directed by Michael Garcia.

Accolades

Charts

Year-end charts

Certifications and sales

References

2021 singles
2021 songs
Thalía songs
Becky G songs
Songs written by Thalía
Songs written by Becky G
Spanish-language songs
Sony Music Latin singles